Seed is a surname. Notable people with the surname include:

 Ahmed Mumin Seed, Somali politician and government minister
Angus Seed (1893–1953), English footballer, manager of Barnsley
Graham Seed (born 1950), English actor
Harry Bolton Seed (1922–1989), British professor of geotechnical engineering at the University of California, Berkeley
 Huck Seed (born 1969), American poker player
Jeremiah Seed (1700–1747), English clergyman and academic
Jimmy Seed (1895–1966), English footballer and football manager
Kev Seed (born 1968), English radio DJ
Michael Seed (born 1957), British Roman Catholic priest
Patricia Seed, American historian and author
Paul Seed (born 1947), British television director and actor
Richard Seed (born 1928), American physicist and entrepreneur
Richard Seed (priest) (born 1949), Church of England priest and archdeacon

Other uses
Joseph Seed, a recurring character from Ubisoft's Far Cry video game series